Mildenitz is a village and a former municipality in the district Mecklenburgische Seenplatte, in Mecklenburg-Vorpommern, Germany. Since 1 January 2015 it is part of the town Woldegk.

References

Villages in Mecklenburg-Western Pomerania